The Everyman Theatre is a 650-seat Victorian theatre on MacCurtain Street in Cork, Ireland. It opened in 1897, and is the oldest purpose-built theatre building in Cork. The Everyman has undergone a number of changes in name and use, through its days as "Dan Lowrey’s Palace of Varieties" (hosting Laurel and Hardy and Charlie Chaplin), life as a cinema, periods of disrepair, and redevelopment as a modern theatre in the 1990s.

The theatre is housed in a listed (protected) Victorian building with a large stage and auditorium, a proscenium arch, four elaborately decorated boxes, a studio space and a bar.

The Everyman's programme is a mix of plays, operas, musicals and concerts, but it specialises in drama and usually stages three in-house productions per year. In the summer months, it hosts productions by Irish playwrights. Other recurring events include the Guinness Jazz Festival in October (for which the theatre is a primary venue), and the Christmas pantomime. A unique feature of the Everyman Palace is that its front of house ushering staff is composed entirely of volunteers.

References

External links
 

Theatres in Cork (city)